Shambles is a Canadian drama film from Quebec. Directed by Karl Lemieux, the film premiered at the 2016 Venice Film Festival before going into theatrical release in Canada in 2017.

The film stars Jean-Simon Leduc as Vincent, a punk rock musician, who while on the run from the mob after stealing $10,000 worth of marijuana, reconnects with his estranged brother (Martin Dubreuil) whose life is also in a downward spiral. The film's original title is a standard Quebec French idiom which literally translates as "damned mess" or "shambles", and is not a reference to poutine in the culinary sense.

The film garnered four Prix Iris nominations at the 19th Quebec Cinema Awards in 2017.

References

External links

2016 films
Canadian crime drama films
Quebec films
French-language Canadian films
2010s Canadian films